USS Lionfish (SS-298), a , was the only ship of the United States Navy named for the lionfish, a scorpaenid fish native to the Pacific and an invasive species found around the Caribbean.  She was designated a National Historic Landmark in 1986, and is now on display at Battleship Cove in Fall River, Massachusetts.

Construction and commissioning
Lionfish was laid down on 15 December 1942; launched on 7 November 1943, sponsored by Mrs. May Philipps Train, wife of Rear Admiral Harold C. Train; and commissioned on 1 November 1944. Her first commanding officer was Lieutenant Commander Edward D. Spruance, son of World War II admiral Raymond Spruance.

World War II
After completing her shakedown cruise off New England, she began her first war patrol in Japanese waters on 1 April 1945. Ten days later, she avoided two torpedoes fired by a Japanese submarine. On 1 May, Lionfish destroyed a Japanese schooner with her deck guns. After a rendezvous with the submarine , she transported United States Army Air Forces B-29 Superfortress survivors to Saipan in the Mariana Islands and then made her way to Midway Atoll in the Northwestern Hawaiian Islands for replenishment.

On 2 June 1945 she started her second war patrol, and on 10 July 1945 fired torpedoes at a surfaced Japanese submarine , after which Lionfishs crew heard explosions and observed smoke through their periscope, although I-162 was undamaged. She subsequently fired on two more Japanese submarines. Lionfish ended her second and last war patrol performing lifeguard duty (the rescue of downed fliers) off the coast of Japan. When World War II ended on 15 August 1945, she headed for San Francisco, California, and was decommissioned at Mare Island Navy Yard in Vallejo, California, on 16 January 1946.

Post World War II
Lionfish was recommissioned on 31 January 1951, and headed for the United States East Coast for training cruises. After participating in NATO exercises and a Mediterranean cruise, she returned to the East Coast and was decommissioned at the Boston Navy Yard on 15 December 1953.

In 1960, the submarine was placed in service, but not recommissioned, as a reserve training submarine at Providence, Rhode Island.

Museum ship

In 1971, she was stricken from the Navy Register. In 1973, she began permanent display as a memorial at Battleship Cove in Fall River, Massachusetts, where she is one of the museum's most popular exhibits.

As Lionfish was never converted to a GUPPY configuration, she is one of the very few preserved American World War II-era submarines in her "as built" configuration.  Because of this remarkable state of preservation, she was designated a National Historic Landmark in 1986.

In popular culture
The submarine is featured on the DVD case of the 2007 Ubisoft game Silent Hunter 4: Wolves of the Pacific.

The submarine was also featured in the 2015 movie drama Subconscious.

Awards
Asiatic-Pacific Campaign Medal with one battle star
World War II Victory Medal
Navy Occupation Medal with "EUROPE" clasp
National Defense Service Medal

See also
List of National Historic Landmarks in Massachusetts
National Register of Historic Places listings in Fall River, Massachusetts

References

External links 

 Battleship Cove
 USS Lionfish Photos on board the Submarine USS Lionfish SS-298 in Fall River, MA
Subconscious (2015) - an independent film featuring the actual USS Lionfish as the on location filming set.
 

 

Balao-class submarines
World War II submarines of the United States
Cold War submarines of the United States
Ships built by William Cramp & Sons
1943 ships
Tourist attractions in Fall River, Massachusetts
Museum ships in Massachusetts
National Historic Landmarks in Massachusetts
Museums in Bristol County, Massachusetts
Military and war museums in Massachusetts
Ships on the National Register of Historic Places in Massachusetts
Buildings and structures in Fall River, Massachusetts
National Register of Historic Places in Fall River, Massachusetts